Anti-Confederation was the name used in what is now the Maritimes by several parties opposed to Canadian Confederation. The Anti-Confederation parties were accordingly opposed by the Confederation Party, that is, the Conservative and Liberal-Conservative parties.

Nova Scotia

In 1867 in Nova Scotia, Anti-Confederates won 36 out of 38 seats in the provincial legislature, and formed a government under William Annand (See 24th General Assembly of Nova Scotia). The Anti-Confederation Party was opposed by the Confederation Party of Charles Tupper. Prominent Anti-confederates included the noted shipbuilder William D. Lawrence, Alfred William Savary and the wealthy merchant Enos Collins.

Federally, in the 1867 federal election, the Anti-Confederates won 18 of Nova Scotia's 19 seats in the House of Commons of Canada. Joseph Howe won the federal seat in Hants County, Nova Scotia, while William D. Lawrence won the Hants County provincial seat. Britain, however, refused to allow Nova Scotia to secede.

While many anti-confederationists threatened to secede and join the United States, Howe was a pragmatist and ultimately accepted Confederation as a fact. He was soon persuaded to join the Cabinet of Sir John A. Macdonald, leading to the movement's collapse (1869).

New Brunswick

There was also an Anti-Confederation Party in New Brunswick led by  Albert James Smith, whose coalition of Conservatives and Reformers won the 1865 election. It was, however, soundly defeated in the 1866 election by the Confederation Party led by Peter Mitchell. The legislature that resulted from that election approved Confederation by a margin of 38 to 1. Accordingly, in the 1867 federal election the Anti-Confederates did not win any of New Brunswick's fifteen seats in the House of Commons of Canada.

While in Nova Scotia and elsewhere, opponents of confederation were predominantly Liberals and supporters were predominantly Tories, in New Brunswick the debate blurred party lines. Anti-Confederate leader Albert Smith and Confederate Peter Mitchell were both Conservatives, while one of the most prominent leaders of the pro-Confederation forces, Samuel Leonard Tilley, was a Liberal. Tilley later joined the government of Sir John A. Macdonald. Both Anti-Confederate and Confederate forces were mixtures of Tories and Reformers (Liberals).

By 1870, the Confederate and Anti-Confederate parties had dissolved and were replaced by the old Liberal and Tory parties.

See also
 List of political parties in Canada
 Secessionist movements of Canada

References

External links 
Anti-Confederation Petition from Nova Scotia, June 1868
Reports of meetings held in the province of Nova Scotia, to consider a repeal of the "British North America Act, 1867."(1868)

Political parties in pre-Confederation New Brunswick
Political parties in pre-Confederation Nova Scotia
Defunct secessionist organizations in Canada
Politics of Nova Scotia